Plenty, Plenty Soul is an album by American jazz vibraphonist Milt Jackson featuring performances recorded in 1957 and released on the Atlantic label.

Reception
The Allmusic review by Scott Yanow stated that "these all-star dates still sound fresh and enthusiastic decades later".

Track listing
All compositions by Milt Jackson, except as indicated
 "Plenty, Plenty Soul" (Milt Jackson, Quincy Jones) - 9:33 
 "Boogity Boogity" (Jones) - 4:55 
 "Heartstrings" - 4:53 
 "Sermonette" (Cannonball Adderley) - 5:23 
 "The Spirit-Feel" - 4:22 
 "Ignunt Oil" - 5:35 
 "Blues at Twilight" (Jones) - 6:46 
Recorded in New York City on January 5 (tracks 4–7) and January 7 (tracks 1–3), 1957

Personnel
Milt Jackson – vibes
Joe Newman - trumpet
Jimmy Cleveland - trombone (tracks 1–3)
Cannonball Adderley - alto saxophone (tracks 1–3)
Frank Foster (tracks 1–3), Lucky Thompson (tracks 4–7) - tenor saxophone
Sahib Shihab - baritone saxophone (tracks 1–3)
Horace Silver - piano
Percy Heath (tracks 1–3), Oscar Pettiford (tracks 4–7) - bass
Art Blakey (tracks 1–3), Connie Kay (tracks 4––7) – drums
Quincy Jones - arranger (tracks 1–3)

References 

Atlantic Records albums
Milt Jackson albums
1957 albums
Albums produced by Nesuhi Ertegun